Joe Hudson (born May 1, 1965) is an American professional stock car racing driver. He last competed part-time in the Camping World Truck Series, driving the No. 74 Chevrolet Silverado for Mike Harmon Racing.

Racing career

Camping World Truck Series
Hudson made his first and only Camping World Truck Series start at Canadian Tire Motorsport Park, driving the No. 74 truck for Mike Harmon Racing. He started 32nd and finished 27th after a brake failure.

Motorsports career results

NASCAR
(key) (Bold – Pole position awarded by qualifying time. Italics – Pole position earned by points standings or practice time. * – Most laps led.)

Camping World Truck Series

 Season still in progress
 Ineligible for series points

References

External links
 

1966 births
Living people

Racing drivers from Alabama
People from Shelby County, Alabama
NASCAR drivers